Hrušovany u Brna is a municipality and village in Brno-Country District in the South Moravian Region of the Czech Republic. It has about 3,500 inhabitants.

Geography
It lies in the Dyje–Svratka Valley. It is situated on the right bank of the small river Šatava.

History
The first written mention of Hrušovany u Brna is from 1252.

Notable people
Jan IV of Pernštejn (1487–1548), nobleman; died here

References

Villages in Brno-Country District